This is a list of the presidents of the Republic of Yucatán during two periods of the nineteenth century. The first Republic of Yucatán, founded May 29, 1823, willingly joined the Mexican federation as the Federated Republic of Yucatán on December 23, 1823, less than seven months later. The second Republic of Yucatán began in 1841, with its declaration of independence from the Mexican Federation. It remained independent for 7 years, after which it rejoined the Mexican Federation.

Officeholders

References 

Diccionario Quintana Roo Enciclopedia Regional, Héctor Campillo Cuautli, Fernández Editores, México, 1988. (pp. 18–19)
Enciclopedia "Yucatán en el tiempo", TOMO III, 1998
Cordourier, Alfonso y otros, Historia y Geografía de Yucatán, EPSA, México 1997 
Miguel Barbachano al Exmo. Sr. Ministro de Relaciones de la República, Mérida, 17 de abril de 1848. Archivo General de la Nación, Gobernación, sin sección, vol. 356, exp. 5.

Electronic Sources
Cuarto de siglo de constiyucionalismo en Yucatán (1825-1850) Anuario Mexicano de Historia del Derecho
160 aniversario de la Bandera de Yucatán (www.yucatan.com.mx)
17 de agosto de 1848. - Yucatán se anexa nuevamente a la República Mexicana. (redescolar.ilce.edu.mx:2000)
La Historia de la República de Yucatán 
"Todas las desgracias anteriores no deben recordarse"
Yucatán en el siglo XIX

Presidents
Presidents by former country